Ancistrus saudades is a species of catfish in the family Loricariidae. It is native to South America, where it occurs in the basins of the Takutu River, the Ventuari River, the Caroní River, and the Caura River in Guyana, Venezuela, and Brazil. The species reaches at least 10.75 cm (4.2 inches) SL and was described in 2019 by Lesley S. de Souza of the Field Museum of Natural History, Donald C. Taphorn of the Royal Ontario Museum, and Jonathan Armbruster of Auburn University alongside five other species of Ancistrus. FishBase does not list this species.

References 

Fauna of South America
Fish described in 2019
saudades